Anthony or Tony Webb(e) may refer to:

Anthony Webb or Spud Webb (born 1963), American basketball player
Anthony Webbe (English politician) (died 1578?), English Member of Parliament
Anthony Webbe (Missouri politician), American politician 
Tony Webb (born 1945), English social scientist
Tony Webb (mayor), English mayor of Colchester